The Cessna 526 CitationJet was a twinjet trainer candidate for the United States Joint Primary Aircraft Training System proposed by Cessna. It was a twin-engined, tandem seat aircraft, based on the Cessna CitationJet executive aircraft. However, it was unsuccessful, with only two prototypes built.

Design and development
The United States military issued a request for proposal for a trainer to be used by the United States Air Force and United States Navy. Cessna responded with the 526, based on its 525 CitationJet civilian business jet. The 526 and 525 shared 75% commonality including the wings, engines and landing gear. The electrical- hydraulic- and fuel systems were also common to the two types. The 526 had a redesigned fuselage featuring a tandem two-seat cockpit with zero-zero ejection seats; and a new empennage with a low-mounted tailplane instead of the 525's T-tail.

The prototype first flew on 20 December 1993 and was followed by a second prototype with its first flight on 2 March 1994.

The CitationJet did not succeed in the competition, which was won by the turboprop Beechcraft T-6 Texan II, a variant of the Pilatus PC-9.

Specifications

See also

References

Notes

Bibliography

1990s United States military trainer aircraft
526 CitationJet
Twinjets
Low-wing aircraft
526
Aircraft first flown in 1993